Deulgaon Raja is a city and a municipal council in Buldhana district in the state of Maharashtra, India. Deulgaon Raja is located at border of Vidarbha and Marathwada.Deulgaon Raja is also called as Pratitirupati by Maharashtrian  people.

Demographics
 India census, Deulgaon Raja had a population of 30,827. Males constitute 52% of the population and females 48%. Deulgaon Raja has an average literacy rate of 76%, higher than the national average of 59.5%: male literacy is 81.5% and, female literacy is 70%. In Deulgaon Raja, 13% of the population is under 6 years of ages. Deulgaon Raja is known for the temple of Balaji.

History

Balaji temple is among the popular religious places of Maharastra and more important is that it is in Deulgaon Raja. Balaji temple has its own festival of "Lalit", celebrated by all Deulgaon Rajakars. The big woods approximately of 30 feet 21 wooden trunks are arranged in line and have diameter of 1 foot. These trunks are worshiped by all devotees. That trunks are usually called as 'laata'. The Sansthan handles the whole work and arrangement of mandir. It is called that the statue is found to Raje Jadhao. He proposed and created the temple. The area around the mandir is known as Baljai faras. The biggest festival of this town is Dashera and which is celebrated a day before main Dashera celebrated among whole INDIA. The god balaji's statue is kept in palakhi during the time of dashera. It is an auspicious day for all the devotees. Many devotees come a day before the ritual of falling of laata. Its the ritual which occurs in very early morning.when laata falls down from that day second festival starts 
Like dipawali. For dipawali in deulgaon raja all deulgaonkers arrange
Yatraa for all tourist who come from out of indian. Out of Maharashtra. Out of buldhana. We welcome all of the with love. The yatra goes till one month.Every year anti-black is celebrated here on 12th November.

References

External links
https://cultural.maharashtra.gov.in/english/gazetteer/BULDHANA/places_Deulgaon%20Raja.html

Cities and towns in Buldhana district
Talukas in Maharashtra